Caupo of Turaida, or Kaupo (died 21 September 1217) was a leader of the Finnic-speaking Livonian people in the beginning of the 13th century, in what is now part of Latvia and Estonia. He is sometimes called a 'King of Livonia', the Chronicle of Henry of Livonia refers to him as quasi rex, 'like a king'.

Biography
Caupo was the first prominent Livonian to be christened. He was probably baptized around 1191 by Theoderic of Turaida, a preacher who would later become the abbot of Daugavgrīva Abbey.  He became an ardent Christian and a friend of Albert of Buxhoeveden, Bishop of Riga, who, in 1203–1204, took him on a journey to Rome and introduced him to Pope Innocent III. The Pope was impressed by the converted pagan chief and presented him a Bible and a hundred gold pieces. When he returned from the journey, his tribe rebelled against him and Caupo took part in a siege of his former fortress in Turaida in 1212. The wooden fort was rebuilt two years later out of brick and stone, closer to its present surviving form.

Caupo participated in a crusader raid against the still pagan Estonians and was killed in the Battle of St. Matthew's Day in 1217, fighting against the troops of the Estonian leader Lembitu of Lehola. Caupo had no male successors, as his son Bertold had been killed 1210 in the Battle of Ümera. He left his inheritance to the church, but the Lieven and Koskull families later claimed female-line descent from him.

Modern Estonians, Latvians, and remaining Livonians do not have a singular view about the historical role of Caupo. Baltic nationalists generally consider him a negative figure and a traitor to his people, however, such claims are typically dismissed by scholars as applying a modern viewpoint to a medieval chieftain. Some Latvian folk tales name him "Kaupo the accursed, the scourge of the Livs,... Kaupo who has sold his soul to the foreign bishops."

See also
 Livonian Crusade

References

1217 deaths
Converts to Roman Catholicism from pagan religions
People from Vidzeme
Military personnel killed in action
Livonian nobility
Christians of the Livonian Crusade
Year of birth unknown